Agriomyia is a genus of wasps in the family Thynnidae.

References

Thynnidae
Hymenoptera genera